Pelochrista arabescana is a species of moth of the family Tortricidae. It is found in China (Hebei, Shanxi, Inner Mongolia, Jilin, Gansu, Qinghai, Ningxia), Mongolia, Iran, Kazakhstan and Europe, where it has been recorded from Hungary, Romania, Russia and Ukraine.

The wingspan is 14–20 mm. Adults have been recorded on wing from June to August.

The larvae feed on Artemisia species.

References

Moths described in 1844
Eucosmini